The Unimog 419, also known as the Freightliner tractor or simply SEE Tractor, is a military vehicle made by Daimler-Benz for the US Army. It is technically related to the Unimog 406. Daimler-Benz designed four different types of the Unimog 419 and made a total of 2416 units, with most of them being SEE tractors. Manufacture took place at Daimler-Benz's Gaggenau plant in Germany, where the Unimog 419 was assembled using the Unimog 406's chassis, the Unimog 416's engine, and American-made off-the-shelf components such as the entire 24-Volt electrical system. The US Army used the Unimog 419 as a combat engineering vehicle.

Unimog 419 types 

All Unimog 419 types have a 2380 mm wheelbase, a closed single cab, and a naturally aspirated straight-six 5.7 liter OM 352 diesel engine rated 81 kW.

Abbreviations:

 SEE: Small Emplacement Excavator
 HME: High Mobility Entrencher
 HMMH: High Mobility Material Handler

Source:

References 

1980s cars
All-wheel-drive vehicles
Military vehicles of the United States
Military trucks of the United States
Off-road vehicles
Military vehicles introduced in the 1980s
Military light utility vehicles